This is a list of VHS and DVD releases of the animated children's television series VeggieTales.

Videos

Original videos (1993–2015)

Theatrical films

Compilation videos

Collections 

 Lessons From The Sock Drawer (May 6, 2008): Includes various "Veggie Vault" Silly Songs, shorts, and briefs including Binky the Opera Singer, Dr. Jiggle & Mr. Sly, The Story of St. Patrick, Paco and The Singing Aardvark,  Gated Community, Paco and the Chicken, The Englishman Who Went Up The Hill, Larry's High Silk Hat, Larry's Lagoon, Modern Major General, Forgive-O-Matic, Larry's Blues, Going Up, Omelet, and Lunch
 The Bumblyburg Super-Hero Value Pack: Includes Larry-Boy! And the Fib from Outer Space!, Larry-Boy and the Rumor Weed, Dave and the Giant Pickle (first Larry-Boy Appearance), and all four episodes of Larryboy: The Cartoon Adventures.
 LarryBoy Superhero Power Pack: Includes Larry-Boy! And the Fib from Outer Space!, Larry-Boy and the Rumor Weed, LarryBoy and the Bad Apple, the 16 Feature Songs of LarryBoy: The New Soundtrack! CD and all four episodes of Larryboy: The Cartoon Adventures.
 The Ultimate Christmas Collection: Includes The Toy That Saved Christmas, The Star of Christmas, Saint Nicholas: A Story of Joyful Giving, the 25 Favorite Christmas Songs! CD, Christmas Sing-Along Songs!, It's a Meaningful Life, and The Little Drummer Boy.
 A Very Veggie Easter Collection: Includes An Easter Carol, Twas The Night Before Easter, and the songs from CD collections "A Very Veggie Easter" and "Hosanna!".
 The Complete Silly Song Collection: Includes Very Silly Songs!, The End of Silliness? and The Ultimate Silly Song Countdown.
 VeggieTales: 30 Episodes DVD Set: Includes Where's God When I'm S-Scared?, God Wants Me to Forgive Them!?!, Are You My Neighbor?, Larry-Boy! And the Fib from Outer Space!, Larry-Boy and the Rumor Weed, LarryBoy and the Bad Apple, The Toy That Saved Christmas, The Star of Christmas, Saint Nicholas: A Story of Joyful Giving, King George and the Ducky, Esther... The Girl Who Became Queen, Duke and the Great Pie War, Minnesota Cuke and the Search for Samson's Hairbrush, Minnesota Cuke and the Search for Noah's Umbrella, Sheerluck Holmes and the Golden Ruler, Rack, Shack and Benny, Dave and the Giant Pickle, Josh and the Big Wall!, The Ballad of Little Joe, Moe and the Big Exit, Tomato Sawyer and Huckleberry Larry's Big River Rescue, It's a Meaningful Life, Sweetpea Beauty: A Girl After God's Own Heart, The Wonderful Wizard of Ha's, Sumo of the Opera, Gideon: Tuba Warrior, Abe and the Amazing Promise, Lyle the Kindly Viking, A Snoodle's Tale and Pistachio - The Little Boy That Woodn't.
 All the Shows Volume 1 1993–2000: Includes "Where's God When I'm S-Scared", "God Wants Me to Forgive Them!?!", "Are You My Neighbor?", "Rack, Shack and Benny", "Dave and the Giant Pickle", "The Toy That Saved Christmas", "Larry-Boy! And the Fib from Outer Space!", "Josh and the Big Wall", "Madame Blueberry" and "Larry-Boy and the Rumor Weed".
 All the Shows Volume 2 2000–2005: Includes "King George and the Ducky", "Esther: The Girl Who Became Queen", "Lyle the Kindly Viking", "The Star of Christmas", "The Ballad of Little Joe", "An Easter Carol", "A Snoodle's Tale", "Sumo of the Opera", "Duke and the Great Pie War" and "Minnesota Cuke and the Search for Samson's Hairbrush".
 All the Shows Volume 3 2006–2010: Includes "Sheerluck Holmes and the Golden Ruler", "LarryBoy and the Bad Apple", "Gideon: Tuba Warrior", "Moe and the Big Exit", "Tomato Sawyer and Huckleberry Larry's Big River Rescue", "Abe and the Amazing Promise", "Minnesota Cuke and the Search for Noah's Umbrella", "Saint Nicholas", "Pistachio" and "Sweetpea Beauty".
 25th Anniversary 10-Movie Collection: Includes Jonah: A VeggieTales Movie, The Pirates Who Don't Do Anything: A VeggieTales Movie, A Snoodle's Tale, Lyle the Kindly Viking, Pistachio - The Little Boy That Woodn't, Sweetpea Beauty, Sumo of the Opera, Sheerluck Holmes and the Golden Ruler, Robin Good and His Not So Merry Men and The Penniless Princess.
 The VeggieTales Christmas Classics: Includes The Toy That Saved Christmas, The Star of Christmas, Saint Nicholas: A Story of Joyful Giving, Christmas Sing-Along Songs!, It's a Meaningful Life, The Little Drummer Boy and Merry Larry and the True Light of Christmas.
 LarryBoy Ultimate Superhero Collection: Includes Larry-Boy! And the Fib from Outer Space!, Larry-Boy and the Rumor Weed, LarryBoy and the Bad Apple, The League of Incredible Vegetables, and all four episodes of Larryboy: The Cartoon Adventures.

Double features 

 Holiday Double Feature: Includes The Toy that Saved Christmas and The Star of Christmas.
 Lessons in Telling the Truth and The Power of Words Double Feature: Includes Larry-Boy! And the Fib from Outer Space! and Larry-Boy and the Rumor Weed.
 Lessons in Thankfulness and Courage Double Feature: Includes Madame Blueberry and Esther... The Girl Who Became Queen.
 Lessons in Obedience and Selfishness Double Feature: Includes Josh and the Big Wall and King George and the Ducky.
 Halloween Double Feature: Includes Where's God When I'm S-Scared? and Rack, Shack & Benny.
 Heroic Legends Double Feature: Includes The League of Incredible Vegetables and Esther... The Girl Who Became Queen.
 Lessons in Friendship and Facing Hardship Double Feature: Includes Sheerluck Holmes and the Golden Ruler and The Ballad of Little Joe.
 Silly Songs! Double Feature: Includes Very Silly Songs! and The Ultimate Silly Song Countdown.
 Good Friends! Double Feature: Includes Rack, Shack & Benny and Tomato Sawyer and Huckleberry Larry's Big River Rescue .
 Growing Generous Kids!: Includes Lyle the Kindly Viking and King George and the Ducky.
 Growing Patient Kids!: Includes Abe and the Amazing Promise and Sumo of the Opera.
 Growing Faithful Kids!: Includes "The Grapes Of Wrath" (from God Wants Me To Forgive Them!?!) and 'Gideon: Tuba Warrior'''.
 Growing Kindhearted Kids!: Includes  Tomato Sawyer and Huckleberry Larry's Big River Rescue and Babysitter in De Nile" (from Duke and the Great Pie War)
 Growing Courageous Kids!: Includes The Ballad of Little Joe and "Bully Trouble" (from Minnesota Cuke and the Search for Samson's Hairbrush).
 Growing Confident Kids!: Includes Rack, Shack and Benny and A Snoodle's Tale.
 Movie Time!: Includes Jonah: A VeggieTales Movie &  The Pirates Who Don't Do Anything.

 Triple features 

 Bob and Larry's Favorite Stories! (March 31, 1998): Includes Where's God When I'm S-Scared?, God Wants Me to Forgive Them!?!, and Are You My Neighbor?.
 More of Bob and Larry's Favorite Stories (August 25, 1998): Includes Rack, Shack and Benny, Dave and the Giant Pickle, and Larry-Boy! And the Fib from Outer Space!.
 Junior's Favorite Stories (November 9, 1999): Includes Josh and the Big Wall!, Very Silly Songs!, and Madame Blueberry.
 Larry's Favorite Stories (May 23, 2000): Includes Larry-Boy and the Rumor Weed, The End of Silliness, and King George and the Ducky.
 Classics from the Crisper (September 18, 2001): Includes Esther: The Girl Who Became Queen, Lyle the Kindly Viking, and The Ultimate Silly Song Countdown.
 "Lions, Shepherds and Queens (Oh My!)" Includes "Daniel and the Lions' Den", "Dave and the Giant Pickle" and "Esther... The Girl Who Became Queen".
 "Stand Up, Stand Tall, Stand Strong!" Includes "The Story of Flibber-o-Loo", "Rack, Shack and Benny" and "Josh and the Big Wall!"
 Multi-Feature: Includes Minnesota Cuke and the Search for Samson's Hairbrush, Sumo of the Opera, and Dave and the Giant Pickle.
 Girl Power! A VeggieTriple Feature: Includes Madame Blueberry, Duke and the Great Pie War, and Esther: The Girl Who Became Queen.
 Superhero! A VeggieTriple Feature: Includes Larry-Boy! And the Fib from Outer Space!, Larry-Boy and the Rumor Weed, and LarryBoy and the Bad Apple.
 Lessons for a Lifetime! A VeggieTriple Feature: Includes Jonah: A VeggieTales Movie, Lyle the Kindly Viking, and Gideon: Tuba Warrior.
 God Made You Special! (August 11, 2007): Includes "Dave and the Giant Pickle", "The Gourds Must Be Crazy", and "A Snoodle's Tale". Also includes a new short, "Bob's Vacation"
 "A Baby, A Quest and the Wild Wild West!": Includes "The Ballad of Little Joe", "Babysitter in DeNile" and "Mo and the Big Exit".
 God Loves You Very Much! A VeggieTriple Feature: Includes "The Ballad of Little Joe", "Gideon, Tuba Warrior", and "Rack, Shack and Benny".
 "A Silly Little Thing Called Love" A VeggieTale Triple Feature : Includes "The Story of Flibber -o-Loo", "Duke and the Great Pie War", and "Madame Blueberry".
 "Happy Together": Includes "Sherlock Holmes and the Golden Ruler", "The Grapes of Wrath" and "Esther... The Girl Who Became Queen".
 Veggie Classics! A VeggieTriple Feature: Includes Where's God When I'm S-Scared?, God Wants Me to Forgive Them!?!, and Are You My Neighbor?.
 Bible Heroes! A VeggieTriple Feature: Includes Josh and the Big Wall!, Esther... The Girl Who Became Queen, and Moe and the Big Exit.
 Royalty Collection! A Queen, A King and a Very Blue Berry: Includes Madame Blueberry, King George and the Ducky, and Esther: The Girl Who Became Queen.
 Adventure Pack! The Search and Rescue Edition!: Includes Minnesota Cuke and the Search for Samson's Hairbrush, Sheerluck Holmes and the Golden Ruler, and Tomato Sawyer and Huckleberry Larry's Big River Rescue.
 Good Guys! Triple Feature: Includes Dave and the Giant Pickle, Josh and the Big Wall!, and Tomato Sawyer and Huckleberry Larry's Big River Rescue.

 Quadruple features 

 Funtastic Four!: Includes Robin Good, Big River Rescue, Minnesota Cuke and the Search for Noah's Umbrella, and Sheerluck Holmes.
 Bible Story Collection: Includes King George and the Ducky, Dave and the Giant Pickle, Rack, Shack and Benny and Josh and the Big Wall! Princess Story Collection: Includes Sweetpea Beauty, Esther... The Girl Who Became Queen, The Penniless Princess, and Princess and the Popstar.
 Bible Heroes - 4 Movie Collection: Includes Noah's Ark, Gideon: Tuba Warrior, Josh and the Big Wall! and King George and the Ducky.
 Bible Heroes - 4 Movie Collection 2: Includes Moe and the Big Exit, The Ballad of Little Joe, Esther... The Girl Who Became Queen and Dave and the Giant Pickle.
 Superhero! - 4 Movie Collection: Includes Larry-Boy! And the Fib from Outer Space!, Larry-Boy and the Rumor Weed, LarryBoy and the Bad Apple and The League of Incredible Vegetables''.

References 

VeggieTales